( for short) is a third-sector railway company in Nagasaki, Japan.

Shimabara Railway also operates buses, taxis and passenger ferries; as well as other non-transport ventures.

Nagasaki Prefecture and Cities in Shimabara area came to hold stocks in the company after an eruption disaster of Unzen Fugen-dake in an effort to increase capital.

History
May 5, 1908: Shimabara Railway Co., Ltd. established.  
1911:
April 1: Line opened with a JGR Class 150 locomotive (built 1871) from the Ministry of Railways.
September 24, 1913: Line from Isahaya to Shimabara Minato (now South Shimabara) opened.
April 10, 1919: Kuchinotsu Railway Co., Ltd. established. 
April 22, 1922: Kuchinotsu Railway line from Shimabara Minato to Dozaki opened.
March 1, 1928: Kuchinotsu Railway line from Kazusa to Shimabara Minato opened.
December 5, 1930: Shimabara Railway bus service established.
June 1, 1935: Shimabara Railway line to Unzen opened (discontinued 1938).
1935: Kuchinotsu Railway bus service established.
1938: Kuchinotsu Railway buys Oniike route.
July 1, 1943: Shimabara and Kuchinotsu Railway companies merge.
July 1956 Island Tourist Rail Co., Ltd. established.
March 1966 Island Rail Taxi Co., Ltd. established.
July 1978 Isahaya Terminal Hotel opened.
November 1990-June 1991: Eruption of Mount Unzen; service from Fukae to Shimabara discontinued.
October 1995: Nagasaki and cities and towns along the line increase their stock holdings in the company.
April 1, 1997: Fukae-Shimabara service resumed after reconstruction work. Tourist tram train operation started.
August 1997: Shimabara - Omuta route opened; Shimatetsu high speed passenger ship service began.

Current (October 2015) capital of 300 million yen.

Line
Shimabara Railway Line

References

External links

Shimabara Railway Official Site 

Railway companies of Japan